A private town is a town owned by a private person or a family.

History of Private Towns in Poland 

In the history of Poland, private towns (miasta prywatne) were towns within the lands owned by magnates, bishops, knights, princes, etc.

Amongst the most well-known former private magnate towns are Białystok, Zamość, Rzeszów, Puławy, Tarnów, Siedlce, Biała Podlaska, Ivano-Frankivsk (Polish: Stanisławów), Ternopil (Polish: Tarnopol) and Uman (Polish: Humań). Magnate palaces and castles can be often found in former private magnate towns. Examples include the Branicki Palace in Białystok, the Czartoryski Palace in Puławy, the Zamoyski Palace in Zamość, the Lubomirski Castle in Rzeszów, the Radziwiłł Palace in Biała Podlaska, the Ogiński Palace in Siedlce, the Potocki Palaces in Międzyrzec Podlaski, Tulchyn and Vysokaye, the Wiśniowiecki Palace in Vyshnivets, the Zbaraski Castle in Zbarazh.

The most known former private bishop towns include Łódź, Kielce, Łowicz, Pabianice and Skierniewice.

Private magnate towns 
Former Polish private magnate towns by population as of 2015:

Private clergy towns 

Former Polish private clergy towns by population as of 2015:

World Heritage Sites
World Heritage Sites in former private towns of Poland:

See also
Company town
Closed town
Ghost town

References

Types of towns